The Dizon-Ramos Museum is situated in Bacolod, Negros Occidental, Philippines beside the Mariano Ramos Ancestral House.

History
The house was built in 1950s. It was converted to a museum in 2007. It is located in Burgos Ave, Bacolod, Negros Occidental.

Mariano Ramos Ancestral House
The Mariano Ramos Ancestral House is the home of the late Mariano Ramos, first appointed Presidente Municipal of Bacolod City, Philippines. It was built in the 1930s and its architecture is a combination of Castilian and Tuscan and comprises three storeys including the tower room, known as the torre. It is beside the Dizon-ramos museum.

Collections
The collections are the old photographs, naff ceramics, glassware, jewelry, crystals, porcelain paintings and religious knick-knacks.

See also
Balay Negrense
The Ruins (mansion)
Hacienda Rosalia
Silliman Hall
Museo Negrense de La Salle
Dr. Jose Corteza Locsin Ancestral House

References

External links
 https://www.inspirock.com/philippines/bacolod/dizon-ramos-museum-a984362129
 http://www.phtourguide.com/dizon-ramos-museum-in-bacolod/
 https://www.lonelyplanet.com/philippines/bacolod/attractions/dizon-ramos-museum/a/poi-sig/1191335/357337
 http://www.rjdexplorer.com/dizon-ramos-museum-bacolod-then-and-now/
 http://www.bacolodcity.gov.ph/museumsgalleries.htm

Buildings and structures in Bacolod
Historic house museums in the Philippines
Tourist attractions in Bacolod
Neoclassical architecture in the Philippines